New Market, also known as the McDonald-Rhodus-Lesesne House, is a historic home and national historic district located near Greeleyville, Williamsburg County, South Carolina.  It encompasses 2 contributing buildings and 2 contributing sites.  The house was built about 1820, and a one-story, frame extended Double Pen house over a raised brick basement.  It features a typical "rain porch" on the front of the house supported by four tapered and chamfered wooden posts. Also on the property are a 1 1/2-story frame tobacco pack house (c. 1916), the foundation of a greenhouse, and a pecan avenue and grove (c. 1920).

It was listed on the National Register of Historic Places in 1998.

References

Farms on the National Register of Historic Places in South Carolina
Historic districts on the National Register of Historic Places in South Carolina
Houses completed in 1820
Houses in Williamsburg County, South Carolina
National Register of Historic Places in Williamsburg County, South Carolina